Dance on Roses (Swedish: Dans på rosor) is a 1954 Swedish comedy drama film directed by Schamyl Bauman and starring Sickan Carlsson, Karl-Arne Holmsten and Olof Winnerstrand. It was shot at the Centrumateljéerna Studios in Stockholm. The film's sets were designed by the art director Arthur Spjuth.

Main cast
 Sickan Carlsson as 	Marianne Molin
 Karl-Arne Holmsten as 	Stig Broman, engineer
 Olof Winnerstrand as 	Anders Olander
 Dagmar Ebbesen as 	Johanna
 John Botvid as 	Gustafsson
 Egon Larsson as Kurre Jansson
 Elisaveta as 	Clairy
 Hjördis Petterson as Olga Eckers
 Inger Juel as Maggie Broman
 Sten Gester as 	Sten Berger
 Axel Högel as 	Plinten Johansson
 Sten Mattsson as Varubud

References

Bibliography 
 Per Olov Qvist & Peter von Bagh. Guide to the Cinema of Sweden and Finland. Greenwood Publishing Group, 2000.

External links 
 

1954 films
1954 comedy-drama films
Swedish comedy-drama films
1950s Swedish-language films
Films directed by Schamyl Bauman
1950s Swedish films